"Leaving" is a song by English synth-pop duo Pet Shop Boys from their eleventh studio album, Elysium (2012). It was released as the album's second single on 12 October 2012. It entered the UK Singles Chart at number 44.

Track listings

Charts

References

2012 singles
2012 songs
Parlophone singles
Pet Shop Boys songs
Songs written by Chris Lowe
Songs written by Neil Tennant